The 2014 Queensland Firebirds season saw the Queensland Firebirds netball team compete in the 2014 ANZ Championship. Firebirds finished second   during the regular season and in the overall championship. Firebirds lost both the major semi-final and the grand final to Melbourne Vixens.

Players

Player movements

2014 roster

Milestones
 Romelda Aiken became the first player to score 3500 ANZ Championship goals when she scored 46 from 53 in Round 13 against Central Pulse. 
 Clare McMeniman made her 100th senior club appearance.

Three international captains
Laura Geitz, Romelda Aiken and Clare McMeniman all captained their national teams in medal winning performances. Geitz captained Australia when they won the gold medal at the 2014 Commonwealth Games. The squad also included Kim Ravaillion. Aiken was co-captain of the Jamaica team that won the bronze medal. Clare McMeniman co-captained  the Australia team that won the silver medal at the 2014 Fast5 Netball World Series. Gabi Simpson, Amorette Wild were also members of the team.

Regular season

Fixtures and results
Round 1

Round 2

Round 3

Round 4

Round 5

Round 6

Round 7

Round 8

Round 9

Round 10

Round 11

Round 12
Queensland Firebirds received a bye.
Round 13

Round 14

Final table

Finals

Major semi-final

Preliminary final

Grand final

Award winners

Mission Queensland Firebirds Awards

Notes
  Romelda Aiken and Laura Geitz shared the award.

Australian Netball Awards

References

Queensland Firebirds seasons
Queensland Firebirds